WRLD (95.3 FM, "95.3 Smooth R&B") is a radio station broadcasting an urban adult contemporary music format. Licensed to Valley, Alabama, United States, the station serves the Columbus, Georgia, area. The station is currently owned by PMB Broadcasting, LLC. The station features programming from Westwood One.  Its studios are co-located with four other sister stations on Wynnton Road in Columbus east of downtown, and its transmitter is located south of Valley.

History
This station's original construction permit was granted by the Federal Communications Commission on March 4, 1992. The new station was assigned the call letters WUAF on April 23, 1992. The station's callsign was changed to WRLD-FM on February 22, 1994. After several delays, WRLD-FM received its license to cover on April 5, 1996.

In May 1999, Pearce Broadcasting Company, Inc., reached an agreement to sell WRLD-FM to McClure Broadcasting, Inc. The FCC approved the deal on July 22, 1999, and the transaction was consummated on September 21, 1999.

In December 2002, McClure Broadcasting, Inc., (Chuck McClure Jr., president) reached an agreement to sell WRLD-FM to Archway Broadcasting Group (Al Vicente, president/CEO) through their affiliate ABG Georgia Licenses, LLC. This was part of a four-station deal, along with WRCG, WCGQ, and WKCN, for a reported combined sale price of $15 million. The deal was approved by the FCC on February 21, 2003, and the transaction was consummated on April 25, 2003. At the time of the sale, WRLD-FM carried an oldies music format.

On July 31, 2008, local investment group PMB Broadcasting LLC (headed up by Jim Martin) purchased this station along with Columbus-area sister stations WRCG, WCGQ, and WKCN from Archway Broadcasting Group LLC for a reported sale price of $7.2 million.

On September 6, 2010, the station shortened its call sign from WRLD-FM to simply WRLD.

On June 6, 2014, WRLD shifted their format from oldies to classic hits.

On August 12, 2016, WRLD changed their format from classic hits to classic country, branded as "95.3 Kissin' Country" (swapping formats with WBOJ 1270 AM Columbus, GA.

On September 1, 2019, WRLD changed their format from classic country to urban adult contemporary, branded as "95.3 Smooth R&B").

Previous logos

References

External links

RLD
Urban adult contemporary radio stations in the United States
Radio stations established in 1996
1996 establishments in Alabama